The Argentine Great Western Railway (AGWR) (in Spanish: Ferrocarril Gran Oeste Argentino) was a British-owned railway company, founded in 1887, that operated a broad gauge, railway network in the Argentine provinces of San Luis, San Juan and Mendoza. In 1907 it was taken over on a lease by the Buenos Aires and Pacific Railway (BA&P).

The AGWR was founded in 1887, and in the same year bought the 518 km line connecting  Villa Mercedes in San Luis Province with Mendoza and San Juan in the rich wine-producing districts at the foot of the Andes.  This line had been built by the State-owned company Ferrocarril Andino between 1878 and 1885 as the middle section of a planned transcontinental route from Buenos Aires to the border with Chile.

Next the AGW embarked upon the building of branch lines and feeders in northern San Luis Province and southwards through Mendoza Province, transforming the network into a regional system geared to the needs of this wine-producing region.  As a result, the company saw its traffic returns increase dramatically between 1895 and 1905, although there was always fierce competition from the BA&P.

In 1903 the AGW took over a lease on the working and management of the Transandine Railway which was under construction and in financial difficulties. In 1905 the AGW, together with the BA&P, agreed to guarantee the stock of the Transandine, thereby enabling them to raise additional funds. Two years later the AGW was taken over on a lease by the BA&P who at the same time took over the working of the Transandine.

See also 

 Buenos Aires and Pacific Railway
 San Martín Railway

Bibliography

External links 
 

Defunct railway companies of Argentina
Railway companies established in 1887
Railway companies disestablished in 1907
5 ft 6 in gauge railways in Argentina
Transport in Mendoza Province
Transport in San Luis Province
Transport in San Juan Province, Argentina